Johnsbach is a former municipality in the Austrian state of Styria. Since the 2015 Styria municipal structural reform, it is part of the municipality Admont.

Population

References

Ennstal Alps
Cities and towns in Liezen District